Santa Fe Township is one of fifteen townships in Clinton County, Illinois, USA.  As of the 2010 census, its population was 1,136 and it contained 454 housing units.  The township was formed from part of Germantown and Carlyle townships.

Geography

Cities, towns, villages
 Bartelso

Cemeteries
The township contains these six cemeteries: Ira Maddux, Johnson, Locey, Old Nichols on the Ridge, Saint Cecelia and Sharp.

Major highways
  Illinois Route 161

Lakes
 Big Flat Lake
 Cow Lake
 Goose Lake
 Hog Lake
 Horseshoe Lake
 Little Swan Lake
 Little Flat Lake
 Long Lake
 Savage Lake
 Townsend Lake
 Wildcat Lake

Landmarks
 Royal Lake Resort (southwest half)

Demographics

School districts
 Carlyle Community Unit School District 1
 Central Community High School District
 Bartelso Elementary School District

Political districts
 Illinois' 19th congressional district
 State House District 107
 State Senate District 54

References
 
 United States Census Bureau 2007 TIGER/Line Shapefiles
 United States National Atlas

External links
 City-Data.com
 Illinois State Archives

Townships in Clinton County, Illinois
Townships in Illinois